Eric Moussambani Malonga (born 31 May 1978) is an Equatoguinean swimmer. Nicknamed Eric the Eel by the media, Moussambani won brief international fame at the 2000 Summer Olympics for an extremely unlikely victory. Moussambani, who had never seen an Olympic-sized swimming pool before, swam his heat of the 100 m freestyle on 19 September in the unprecedentedly slow time of 1:52.72. This was the slowest time in Olympic history by far, and Moussambani had trouble finishing the race, but he won his heat after both his competitors were disqualified due to false starts. Although Moussambani's time was still too slow to advance to the next round, he set a new personal best and an Equatoguinean national record. He later became the coach of the national swimming squad of Equatorial Guinea.

Career 
Moussambani gained entry to the Olympics without meeting the minimum qualification requirements via a wildcard draw designed to encourage participation by developing countries lacking full training facilities. Pieter van den Hoogenband won in a time of 48.30 seconds (setting a world record of 47.84 in the semi-finals); Moussambani took more than twice that time to finish (1:52.72). "The last 15 metres were very difficult", Moussambani said. Because the other two swimmers in his heat made false starts and were thus disqualified, he won the heat unopposed.

Before coming to the Olympics, Moussambani had never seen a 50-metre-long (160 feet) Olympic-size swimming pool. He took up swimming eight months before the Olympics and had practiced in a lake, and later a 12-metre swimming pool in a hotel in Malabo, that he was only given access to between 5 and 6 am.

Moussambani's performance generated spectator and media interest in Paula Barila Bolopa, the only other Equatoguinean swimmer at the 2000 Summer Olympics. Bolopa competed in the women's 50 metres freestyle event, struggling to finish the race with a time of 1:03.97. In setting a record for the slowest time in Olympic history for that event, she also achieved major celebrity status.

In 2001, Moussambani competed in the 50 metres freestyle at the 2001 World Aquatics Championship in Fukuoka, Japan, finishing 88th out of 92 athletes. He set a new Equatorial Guinean record for the distance. He was the first male athlete in the nation's history ever to participate in the event.

Despite eventually lowering his personal best in the 100 metres freestyle to under 57 seconds, Moussambani was denied entry into the 2004 Olympic Games due to a visa bungle. He did not take part in the 2008 Summer Olympics. In March 2012 he was appointed coach of the national swimming squad of Equatorial Guinea.

Similarly acclaimed athletes 

In subsequent Olympic Games, international media occasionally referred to Moussambani's potential successors—athletes who might record spectacularly poor times. Before the 2008 Summer Olympics, media in several countries—including Australia, Denmark, Canada, New Zealand and the United Kingdom—suggested that Stany Kempompo Ngangola, a swimmer from DR Congo, would be the Olympics' next "Eric the Eel". The media also described ni-Vanuatu sprinter Elis Lapenmal and Palestinian swimmer Hamza Abdu as "potential successors to Moussambani". During the Games, Cook Islands swimmer Petero Okotai compared himself to "Eric the Eel" upon recording a disappointing time in his event. In the 2016 Olympic Games, Ethiopian swimmer Robel Habte was dubbed "Robel the Whale" after finishing half a lap behind his competitors in the 100-meter freestyle.

During the 2009 IAAF World Championships, various media around the world, including La Nación and The Daily Telegraph, described American Samoan sprinter Savannah Sanitoa as "the new Eric 'the Eel' Moussambani". London 2012 Olympic rower Hamadou Djibo Issaka of Niger was compared to Moussambani for his times of 8:25.56 in the 2000 meter men's single scull qualifying heat and 9:07.99 in the E Semi-finals. Both times were over a minute off the next closest competitor in each race. Moussambani's exploits also triggered comparisons to the 1988 Winter Olympics, when both British ski-jumper Eddie the Eagle and the Jamaican bobsled team became objects of interest and amusement due to their improbable participation in their sports.

See also 
 Philip Boit
 Ranatunge Karunananda
 Trevor Misipeka
 George Tucker
 Adrián Solano
 Elizabeth Swaney

References

External links 
 The True Story of Eric "The Eel" Moussambani at Sydney 2000, featuring a video of the race

1978 births
Living people
Equatoguinean male swimmers
Swimmers at the 2000 Summer Olympics
Olympic swimmers of Equatorial Guinea
Equatoguinean sports coaches